Adamantium is a fictional metal alloy, most famously appearing in American comic books published by Marvel Comics. It is best known as the substance bonded to the character Wolverine's skeleton and claws. 

Adamantium was first mentioned in the Marvel Universe by writer Roy Thomas and artists Barry Windsor-Smith and Syd Shores in Marvel Comics' The Avengers #66 (July 1969), which presents the substance as part of the character Ultron's outer shell. In the stories where it appears, the defining quality of adamantium is its practical indestructibility.

Etymology
The word is a pseudo-Latin neologism (real Latin: adamans, from original Greek ἀδάμας [=indomitable];  adamantem [Latin accusative]) based on the English noun and adjective adamant (and the derived adjective adamantine) added to the neo-Latin suffix "-ium." The adjective  adamant has long been used to refer to the property of impregnable, diamond-like hardness, or to describe a very firm/resolute position (e.g. He adamantly refused to leave). The noun adamant describes any impenetrably or unyieldingly hard substance and, formerly, a legendary stone/rock or mineral of impenetrable hardness and with many other properties, often identified with diamond or lodestone. Adamant and the literary form adamantine occur in works such as The Faerie Queene, Paradise Lost, Gulliver's Travels, The Adventures of Tom Sawyer, The Lord of the Rings, and the film Forbidden Planet (as "adamantine steel"). 

In 1912, The Metallurgo Syndicate, Ltd., of Balfour House, used "Adamantium" (with a capital 'A') as a product brand when they exhibited "two of their specialities in the shape of Adamantium bronze—a high-class non-corrosive, anti-friction metal..."

The term adamantium occurs in the 1941 short story "Devil's Powder" by Malcolm Jameson:"It was a bullet. It was a small slug of adamantium, the toughest and hardest of all metals..."All these uses predate the use of adamantium in Marvel's comics.

History and properties
According to the comic books, the components of the alloy are kept in separate batches—typically in blocks of resin—before molding. Adamantium is prepared by melting the blocks together, mixing the components while the resin evaporates. The alloy must then be cast within eight minutes. Marvel Comics' adamantium has an extremely stable molecular structure that prevents it from being further molded even if the temperature is high enough to keep it in its liquefied form. In its solid form, it is described as a dark, shiny gray, like high-grade steel or titanium. It is almost impossible to destroy or fracture in this state, and when molded to a sharp edge, it can penetrate most lesser materials with minimal force.

The Marvel Comics character Wolverine discovers an adamantium-laced skull in the character Apocalypse's laboratory and says it seems to have been there for eons.

As a key component
Adamantium appears in various Marvel Comics publications and licensed products, where it is found in:
 Ultron's outer shell
 Wolverine's skeleton and claws
 Sabretooth's skeleton and claws were laced with adamantium in a 1998 storyline.
 Captain America's second shield, alloyed with vibranium and steel
 The damaged bone of Bullseye's vertebrae
 Lady Deathstrike's skeleton and talons
 X-23's claws
 The Russian's body, following his resurrection by General Kreigkopf

Other versions

Secondary adamantium
Marvel’s comic books introduced a variant of "true" adamantium, “secondary adamantium”, to explain why, in certain stories, adamantium was shown to be damaged by sufficiently powerful conventional forces. Its resilience is described as far below that of “true“ adamantium.

Appearances of secondary adamantium in Marvel comic books include the casing of the supercomputer F.A.U.S.T., a suit constructed by F.A.U.S.T. and Blastaar for Stilt-Man, a retractable protective dome around Exile Island, and an army of Ultron duplicates.

Ultimate Marvel
In stories published under the Marvel Comics Ultimate Marvel imprint, adamantium is highly durable and can shield a person's mind from telepathic probing or attacks. It is a component of the claws and skeleton of Ultimate Wolverine and of the Ultimate Lady Deathstrike character. This version of adamantium is not unbreakable. In Ultimates #5, the Hulk breaks a needle made of adamantium. In Ultimate X-Men #11 (December 2001), an adamantium cage is damaged by a bomb. In Ultimate X-Men #12 (January 2002), one of Sabretooth's four adamantium claws is broken.

Comparison with real materials
Scientist David Evans argued that as adamantium "is considered to be a very dense and indestructible metal" the most suitable real material to model it would be "[o]smium, the densest known metallic element".

See also
 Unobtainium
 Vibranium

References

Fictional metals
Fictional elements introduced in the 1960s